Marcela Păunescu (born 11 January 1955) is a Romanian gymnast. She competed at the 1972 Summer Olympics.

References

External links
 

1955 births
Living people
Romanian female artistic gymnasts
Olympic gymnasts of Romania
Gymnasts at the 1972 Summer Olympics
Sportspeople from Craiova